Glyfada is a suburb in South Athens located in the Athens Riviera along the Athens coast. It is situated in the southern parts of the Athens' Urban Area. The area stretches from the foot of the Hymettus mountain to the Saronic Gulf. It is the largest of Athens' southern suburbs.

History
In ancient times, the area was a deme known as Aixone. Today, Glyfada is packed with some of the capital's best-known nightclubs, upscale restaurants and shops. It could be argued to be one of the most "Americanized" of Athenian municipalities, since an American airbase was located nearby until the early 1990s. The base's population contributed in part to Glyfada's character, leading to a unique blend of Greek and American atmosphere and cuisine. Although the base is now gone and the school relocated, Glyfada still retains part of its American flavor while continuing to offer distinctly Greek cuisine, entertainment and nightlife.

Glyfada was established as the heart of Athens' southern suburbs, because of its prime waterfront location, rich commercial center, and modern business district. It has been described as the headpoint of the 'Athens Riviera' and features some of Europe's most opulent seafront residences, gardens and extensive beachfront property, with a modern marina.

The town hall is located at the center of the municipality; nearby, Glyfada's shopping district has one of the most vibrant and diversified commercial centers of Athens' neighborhoods, with a collection ranging across specialist and designer boutiques. Its proximity to a succession of Beaches and a concentrated seaside club scene also greatly increases the number of visitors during the summer months. The area's shopping district runs across Metaxa Avenue and Grigoriou Labraki Street while both the offices of major businesses and shopping areas also dot the Avenues Vouliagmenis, Gounari and Gennimata.

At the beginning of the 20th century the town had already changed its name to "Glyfada", a name given because of the presence of salt-water wells typical of this area.

Geography

The municipality has an area of 25.366 km2 and it is located in the Athens Riviera.

Northwest is the golf course of Athens, the Glyfada Golf Club, located south of the former Ellinikon Airport. To the east and northeast there is an urban sprawl which spreads over the southwest shoulder of Mt. Hymettus and its rocky landscape.

Climate
Glyfada has a hot semi-arid climate. It has mild winters and hot summers, with particularly warm summer nights. The driest months are during the summer while the rainiest period is during the fall.

Transportation

Glyfada is connected to central Athens via two major avenues (Poseidonos Avenue and Vouliagmenis Avenue) and a tram line operated by STASY S.A which goes across the seaside next to Poseidonos Avenue. An extension of the Line 2 of Athens Metro from Elliniko station to the south, with two stations in Ano Glyfada and Glyfada is being planned. A version of these plans includes a third station between Ano Glyfada and Glyfada stations.

Municipality
32,492 people registered with the Municipality of Glyfada voted during the Municipal Elections of October 2006. At the second round, 54.79% of the votes were for Thanasis Papakostas, who was the mayor of Glyfada for the 2006–2010 period.
Kostantinos Kokoris was just elected mayor. In 2014, George Papanikolaou was elected mayor in the Glyfada municipality.

Sports
The Glyfada Indoor Hall is located at the Municipality, formerly a major indoor sport venue of local Athens teams. Glyfada is the seat of ANO Glyfada, club with many honours in Greek Water Polo and Glyfada F.C.

Famous residents and people

Sophia Aliberti, TV personality and actress
Bessy Argyraki, Greek singer, Eurovision contestant and ex member of Glyfada's city council
Anna Diamantopoulou, former Greek EU representative and former minister of Education
Christos Dantis, Greek Rock artist
Predrag Đorđević, Serbian footballer
Evridiki, Greek Singer
Eleni Foureira, Greek Singer
Takis Fyssas, Greek footballer
Mihalis Hatzigiannis, Greek Cypriot artist
Kalomira, Pop singer and Eurovision contestant
Giorgos Karagounis, Greek footballer
Zeta Makripoulia, Greek actress
Giorgos Mazonakis, Greek singer
Constantine Mitsotakis, former Prime Minister of Greece
Tony Mokbel, convicted Australian criminal
Fani Palli-Petralia, former Greek Minister of Tourism
Giannis Ploutarhos, Greek singer
Alexandros Panagoulis, Greek politician and poet
Elena Paparizou, Pop singer and Eurovision winner
Giannis Parios, Greek singer
Antonis Remos, Greek singer
Tolis Voskopoulos, Greek singer
Mikael Nilsson, retired football player from Sweden
Peja Stojaković, retired NBA player from Serbia
Arseldi Simaj,wfc world champion
 Liam Palmer, proud British musician and artist

Historical population

Districts
Agios Nikolaos, Glyfada
Kolimvitirio
Eksoni
Evriali
Pirnari
Egli
Ano Glyfada
Terpsithea

Twin cities
Glyfada is twinned with the following cities:
 Bayside, New South Wales, Australia
 Niš, Serbia
 Gżira, Malta
 Vidnoye, Moscow Oblast, Russia

See also

List of cities in Greece
List of settlements in Attica
List of municipalities of Attica

References

External links

Glyfada-Γλυφάδα 
 https://web.archive.org/web/20100415210820/http://www.glyfadiotes.gr/
Geographical Information
Info Pages – Glyfada

 
Municipalities of Attica
Populated places in South Athens (regional unit)
Shopping districts and streets in Greece